Demidovo is a rural locality (a village) and the administrative center of Demidovskoye Rural Settlement, Gus-Khrustalny District, Vladimir Oblast, Russia. The population was 577 as of 2010. There are 5 streets.

Geography 
Demidovo is located 40 km southwest of Gus-Khrustalny (the district's administrative centre) by road. Aristovo is the nearest rural locality.

References 

Rural localities in Gus-Khrustalny District
Ryazan Governorate